Cocculinella is a genus of small, deep water sea snails, marine gastropod mollusks in the family Cocculinellidae, the limpets.

Species
Species within the genus Cocculinella include:
 Cocculinella coercita (Hedley, 1907)
 Cocculinella kopua B.A. Marshall, 1983
 Cocculinella minutissima (E. A. Smith, 1904)
 Cocculinella osteophila B.A. Marshall, 1983

References

External links
 To ITIS
 To World Register of Marine Species

Cocculinellidae
Gastropod genera